The Matsés  or Mayoruna are an indigenous people of the Peruvian and Brazilian Amazon. Their traditional homelands are located between the Javari and Galvez rivers. The Matsés have long guarded their lands from other indigenous tribes and struggle with encroachment from illegal logging practices and poaching.

The approximately 3,200 Matsés people speak the Matsés language which belongs to the Panoan language family. In the last thirty years, they have become a largely settled people living mostly in permanent forest settlements. However, they still rely on hunting and gathering for most of their subsistence. Their main source of income comes from selling peccary hides and meat.

Name
The word Matsés comes from the word for "people" in the Matsés language.  They are also known as the Mayoruna. The name Mayoruna comes from the Quechua (Runa Simi) language and means "river people."  In Brazil the Matsés people are generally referred to as Mayorunas, while in Peru they are usually called Matsés.

Technology 
The Matsés have an elaborate knowledge of the plant and animal life of the surrounding rainforest. Little is imported into the Matsés communities and most of what they need for survival comes from the rainforest. Traditionally, they hunted with bows and arrows.

Culture 

Their cuisine includes the sweet plantain beverage chapo.

Worldview
In the animist Matsés worldview, there is no distinction between the physical and spiritual worlds, and spirits are present throughout the world. The Matsés believe that animal spirits determine health and success in hunting. They are careful not to offend animal spirits, and have many taboos for hunting different animal species.

Plants, especially trees, hold a complex and important interest for the Matsés. Each plant is associated with an animal spirit.  When a plant product is used as a medicine, it is typically applied externally, and the shaman talks to the animal spirit associated with that plant.

Weapons 
Bows and arrows are the main weapons of the Matsés culture, although they are currently rarely used in personal conflict. Generally they are only used for hunting animals. The Matsés were never known to use war clubs as do the neighboring Korubo. Historically, they used blowguns, similar to the Matis tribe of Brazil; however, they recently abandoned blowguns in favor of bows and arrows.

Marriage 
Matsés families often practice polygamy. Cross-cousin marriages are most common. Marriages are primarily between cousins, with a man marrying the daughter of his father's sister (his aunt).

Recent history 
The Matsés made their first permanent contact with the outside world in 1969 when they accepted SIL missionaries into their communities. Before that date, they were effectively at-war with the Peruvian government, which had bombed their villages with napalm and sent the Peruvian army to invade their communities to counter Matsés raids on villages to kidnap women for the tribe. At present, relations between the Matsés and the Peruvian government are peaceful. Dan James Pantone and Bjorn Svensson described the Matsés first peaceful contact with the outside world in an article in Native Planet. In their article, James and Svensson described the 1969 encounter between the Matsés with SIL linguists Harriet Fields and Hattie Kneeland. That same year, 1969, photojournalist Loren McIntyre made contact with the Matsés as described in Petru Popescu's book Amazon Beaming.

Indigenous political reorganization 
The Matsés are very divided and politically unorganized. Each village has its own chief and there is little centralized authority for the tribe. Lack of political organization has made it difficult for the Matsés people to obtain medical assistance from the outside world.

Land rights
The Matsés have title to the Matsés Indigenous Reserve that was established in 1998. The reserve measures 457000 ha. Despite having title to their own reserve, living conditions for the Matsés have deteriorated. According to a 2006 article in Cultural Survival Quarterly by Dan James Pantone, living conditions have become much worse, to the point that the very survival of the Matsés people is in jeopardy. At present, there is a proposal to expand the Matsés Communal Reserve to give the Matsés people control over their traditional hunting grounds.

Logging controversy
In September 2013, the Matsés chief announced plans to start logging the Matsés Native Community lands and rejected oppositions of environmental organisations which he claimed were manipulating Matsés students. In response, Matsés students claimed that the chief was being manipulated by loggers and demanded that the Matsés chief be removed for not defending the interests of his people.

Municipality corruption
To make matters more complex for the Matsés people, in September 2013 the Matsés mayor (Andres Rodriquez Lopez) of the Yaquerana District was publicly accused of corruption by the municipal regulators who blocked his ability to use the municipal checking account. The municipality where the Matsés live has had a history of fraud and the ex-mayor, Helen Ruiz Torres, was sentenced to six years in jail for embezzling municipal funds.

Conservation Efforts

Acaté Amazon Conservation
Acaté Amazon Conservation is a non-profit that was founded in 2013, but existed since 2006 as a loose organization of its founders, Christopher Herndon, MD, and William Park. Acaté operates projects in the Peruvian Amazon rainforest, and integrates culture, health, and ecology into all of its projects. Its current projects include documenting and preserving the indigenous medicinal knowledge of the Matsés by completing the first traditional medicine encyclopedia written in the Matsés language, resiliency projects / programs utilizing permaculture techniques, and providing the Matsés economic opportunities with renewable non-timber natural products.

See also
 Nu-nu, a snuff used by Matsés men

References

 Romanov S., D.M. Huanan, F.S. Uaqui, and D.W. Fleck. The Traditional Life of the Matsés. CAAAP Press: Lima, Peru. 148 pp.

External links
 Acaté Amazon Conservation.

Additional Resources 
 
 New Amazonian reserve saves over a million acres in Peru
 Mayoruna art, National Museum of the American Indian
 Matsés Indigenous Traditions

Indigenous peoples of the Amazon
Indigenous peoples in Peru
Indigenous peoples in Brazil
Uncontacted peoples